The 1978–79 in English field hockey was the fifth official season since the introduction of an organised league structure and the eighth season featuring the National Clubs Championship.

The Men's Cup was won by Slough who defeated Neston in the final. In the final of the women's cup Chelmsford defeated Leicester 3-0.

The Men's National Inter League Championship brought together the winners of their respective regional leagues. The championship finals were held at Ealing on 22 and 23 September 1979 and won by Isca.

Men's Trueman's National Inter League Championship 
(Held in Ealing, September 22–23)

Group A

Group B

Final

Men's Cup (Rank Xerox National Clubs Championship)

Semi-finals 
(Held on 21 April 1979)

Final 
(Held on 6 May 1979 at Slough)

Slough
Ian Taylor, Andy ChurcherSutinder Singh Khehar
Neston
Smith, Poole (capt)

Women's Cup (National Clubs Championship) 
(April 7)

Final

References 

1978-79
field hockey
field hockey
1979 in field hockey
1978 in field hockey